Øystein Garnes Brun (born 14 April 1975) is the guitarist and founder of the Norwegian heavy metal band Borknagar. He has been the only permanent member of the group and has written almost all of their songs.  Brun is noted for having many albums already written ahead of time.

Biography
After releasing two full-length albums with the death metal band Molested, Brun grew tired of playing death metal, and decided to form a more melodic metal band, inspired by the burgeoning black metal scene. He wrote a group of songs which would eventually become the first songs by Borknagar.

Borknagar
Brun gathered a cast of musicians who were well known in the black metal scene including Infernus of Gorgoroth, Erik Brødreskift of Immortal and Gorgoroth, Ivar Bjørnson of Enslaved, and Kristoffer Rygg of Ulver, Head Control System, and Arcturus. The stature of these musicians caused Malicious Records to award the band with a contract without even hearing them. After the release of their debut album, the band was signed to Century Media, where they remained until 2006. In 2007, they had a three album contract with Indie Recordings, which was terminated in 2011. The band resigned to Century Media shortly after. Through the years, the personnel has changed, but the sound is influenced mainly by Brun, so the style of music has been consistent despite a revolving lineup.

Cronian
In 2004, Brun and Andreas Hedlund founded Cronian, an epic sounding heavy metal band which had been in planning stages since before Hedlund had joined Borknagar. Their debut album Terra was produced by Dan Swanö and released in 2006 on Century Media.

Discography

With Molested
Blod Draum (1995)
Stormvold (EP) (1997)

With Borknagar
Borknagar (1996, Malicious Records, Century Black)
The Olden Domain (1997, Century Black)
The Archaic Course (1998, Century Media Records)
Quintessence (2000, Century Media Records)
Empiricism (2001, Century Media Records)
Epic (2004, Century Media Records)
Origin (2006, Century Media Records)
Universal (2010, Indie Recordings)
Urd (2012, Century Media)
Winter Thrice (2016, Century Media)
True North (2019, Century Media)

With Cronian
Terra (2006)
Enterprise (2008)
Erathems (2013)

References

1975 births
Living people
21st-century Norwegian guitarists
21st-century Norwegian male singers
21st-century Norwegian singers
Norwegian black metal musicians
Norwegian heavy metal guitarists
Norwegian heavy metal singers
Norwegian rock guitarists
Norwegian rock singers
English-language singers from Norway
Borknagar members
Place of birth missing (living people)